The East Gwent Association Football League (currently billed as The Monmouthshire Windows East Gwent Association Football League for sponsorship reasons) is a football league covering the eastern part of the preserved country of Gwent. It is affiliated to the Gwent County Football Association. The leagues are at the seventh and eighth levels of the Welsh football league system.

Area
The area of the league is bordered by the River Severn/Bristol Channel on the South and the River Wye on the East to Monmouth. The league area continues West to include Raglan then following a line south
to, but not including Llanwern , then on to the River Severn /Bristol Channel.

Divisions
The league is composed of two divisions.

Member clubs 2022–23

Division One

 Caldicot Castle
 Caldicot Town third team
 Portskwett & Sudbrook 
 Rockfield Rovers
 Sudbrook Cricket Club 
 Underwood
 Undy Athletic  third team

Division Two

 Caldicot Castle reserves
 Chepstow Town third team
 Portskwett & Sudbrook reserves
 Severn Tunnel Non Political
 Sudbrook Cricket Club reserves
 Thornwell Red & White reserves
 Tintern Abbey
 Underwood reserves

Promotion and relegation
The league features other teams of clubs with representation at higher levels of the Welsh football pyramid. Promotion from the First Division is to the Gwent County League Division Two may be possible if a team is eligible.

Champions: Division One

2003–04: Underwood Athletic 'A'
2006–07: Tintern Abbey
2007–08: Rockfield Rovers (?)
2008–09: Tintern Abbey
2009–10:
2010–11:
2011–12: Tintern Abbey
2012–13: Mathern Wanderers 'A'
2013–14: Underwood Athletic 'A'
2014–15: Sudbrook Cricket Club 'A'
2015–16: Mathern 'A'
2016–17: Underwood Athletic 'A'
2017–18: Caldicot Castle 'A'
2018–19: Caldicot Castle 'A'
2019–20: Iscoed Tafarn
2020–21: No competition
2021–22: Thornwell Red & White

References

External links
 East Gwent AFL

8
1913 establishments in Wales
Sports leagues established in 1913